Pterostylis spissa, commonly known as the cygnet greenhood, is a plant in the orchid family Orchidaceae and is endemic to Victoria. Both flowering and non-flowering plants have a rosette of leaves lying flat on the ground and flowering plants have up to twelve small, green flowers which have a green labellum with a dark green beak-like appendage.

Description
Pterostylis spissa, is a terrestrial,  perennial, deciduous, herb with an underground tuber. The dorsal sepal is gently curved but suddenly curves downward near the tip and is about the same length as the petals. Flowering occurs in October and November.

Taxonomy and naming
The cygnet greenhood was first formally described in 2009 by David Jones and given the name Hymenochilus spissus. The description was published in Australian Orchid Research from a specimen collected near Woorndoo. In 2010, Gary Backhouse changed the name to Pterostylis spissa. The specific epithet (spissa) is a Latin word meaning "close", "dense" or "thick".

Distribution and habitat
Pterostylis spissa is restricted to remnant native grassland among basalt rocks in a few locations to the west of Melbourne.

Conservation
Pterostylis spissa is critically endanged, only known from a few roadside reserves.

References

spissa
Endemic orchids of Australia
Orchids of Victoria (Australia)
Plants described in 2009